Poliops is a genus of tachinid flies in the family Tachinidae.

Species
Poliops auratus Campos, 1953
Poliops striatus Aldrich, 1934

Distribution
Argentina, Chile.

References

Diptera of South America
Exoristinae
Tachinidae genera
Taxa named by John Merton Aldrich